Arantzazu (Spanish, Aránzazu) is a town and municipality located in the province of Bizkaia, in the Autonomous Community of Basque Country, northern Spain.

Toponym 

 Etymologically  Aránzazu  means place of hawthorn and comes from Basque language. In addition, this municipality of Vizcaya has the same name as other district in Oñate (Guipúzcoa) famous for being located there Aránzazu's Sanctuary. In Basque the name is written as Arantzazu.

Architecture 

 San Pedro de Arantzazu is the church of the municipality, finished in 1828.

Population 

 305 inhabitants. (INE 2007).

Geography 

 Elevation: 135 metres.

See also 

 Arantxa

References

External links 

 ARANTZAZU in the Bernardo Estornés Lasa - Auñamendi Encyclopedia (Euskomedia Fundazioa) 

Municipalities in Biscay